Gymnosporangium nelsonii is a fungal plant pathogen found in North America.

References

External links

Fungal plant pathogens and diseases
Fungi described in 1901
Pucciniales